Ishibashi Station is the name of multiple train stations in Japan.

 Ishibashi Station (Tochigi) in Shomotsuke, Tochigi
 Ishibashi Station (Nagasaki) in Nagasaki, Nagasaki

See also
 Ishibashi handai-mae Station (formerly named Ishibashi Station)
 Ise-Ishibashi Station
 Minakuchi Ishibashi Station